Eternity is the third full-length album by the German power metal band Freedom Call. It was released on 3 June 2002 by Steamhammer.

Track listing

Personnel
 Chris Bay – vocals, guitar, keyboards
 Cedric Dupont – guitar
 Ilker Ersin – bass guitar
 Dan Zimmermann – drums

References 

2002 albums
Freedom Call albums
SPV/Steamhammer albums